Graeme Arthur Gahan (10 January 1942 – 23 February 2018) was an Australian rules footballer who played with Richmond in the Victorian Football League (VFL).

Used mostly as a half back, Gahan spent eight seasons at Richmond. He moved to Tasmania in 1967, captain-coaching Scottsdale. An Orchard Trophy winner in his first year, Gahan steered Scottsdale to a Northern Tasmanian Football Association premiership in 1968. The following season he crossed to Glenorchy as coach and they finished fifth in both of his years in charge.

Gahan, who was also a professional sprinter, was later a successful coach with Warragul in the Latrobe Valley Football League.

References

1942 births
2018 deaths
Richmond Football Club players
Scottsdale Football Club players
Scottsdale Football Club coaches
Glenorchy Football Club coaches
Australian rules footballers from Victoria (Australia)